Maieru is a commune in Bistrița-Năsăud County, Transylvania, Romania. It is composed of two villages, Anieș (Dombhát) and Maieru.

People 
 Emil Rebreanu (1891–1917), Austro-Hungarian Romanian military officer executed during World War I
 Maria Cioncan (1977-2007), middle distance runner 
 Octavian Utalea (1868–?), mayor of Cluj (1923–1926)

References 

Communes in Bistrița-Năsăud County
Localities in Transylvania